Coe Glade (August 12, 1900 – September 23, 1985) was an American opera singer. She was born in Chicago. She was a mezzo-soprano. She sang in the opening program at Radio City Music Hall in 1932 and at the Hiram Walker Canadian Club at the Chicago World's Fair in 1934.

Glade sang the lead role in Carmen more than 2,000 times.

She is buried in Myrtle Hill Memorial Park in Tampa, Florida.

References

External links
 
 
 
 Photograph of Glade by Maurice Seymour
 An evening of reminiscenses with Coe Glad and Charles Mintzer, 1983

1900 births
1985 deaths
American operatic mezzo-sopranos
20th-century American women opera singers
Singers from Chicago
Musicians from Tampa, Florida
Singers from Florida
Singers from New York City